Aphomia argentia is a species of snout moth in the genus Aphomia. It was described by Whalley in 1964, and is known from Zambia.

References

Endemic fauna of Zambia
Moths described in 1964
Tirathabini
Fauna of Zambia
Moths of Africa